Paul Haarhuis and Sjeng Schalken were the defending champions but only Haarhuis competed that year with John van Lottum.

Haarhuis and van Lottum lost in the first round to Raemon Sluiter and Martin Verkerk.

Jeff Coetzee and Chris Haggard won in the final 7–6(7–1), 6–3 against André Sá and Alexandre Simoni.

Seeds

  Robbie Koenig /  Thomas Shimada (first round)
  Andrew Kratzmann /  Andrei Olhovskiy (quarterfinals)
  Marius Barnard /  Stephen Huss (first round)
  Devin Bowen /  Ashley Fisher (semifinals)

Draw

External links
 2002 Energis Open Doubles Draw

Dutch Open (tennis)
2002 ATP Tour
2002 Dutch Open (tennis)